Allach-Untermenzing (Central Bavarian: Allach-Untamenzing) is the 23rd borough of Munich, Bavaria, Germany.

Allach 
Situated in extreme northwest of the city, the borough consists of the municipalities of Allach and Untermenzing. Allach was first documented on March 30, 774 as Ahaloh. The name means "forest by the water", where "aha" means water and "loh" means forest. Over time, "loh" became "lach". Allach is one of the oldest independent municipalities in Bavaria. Politically and regionally it was connected to Dachau.

Notable landmarks

Allacher Forst
Bundestagswahlkreis München-West/Mitte
Diamalt
Lochholz
Stimmkreis München-Pasing

Boroughs of Munich